Macrocoma splendidula is a species of leaf beetle endemic to the Canary Islands, described by Thomas Vernon Wollaston in 1862.

Subspecies
There are three subspecies of M. splendidula:

 Macrocoma splendidula franzi Palm, 1976: It is found on El Hierro, and is dedicated to Dr. Herbert Franz.
 Macrocoma splendidula palmaensis Palm, 1977: It is found on La Palma. It was originally named Macrocoma occidentalis by Palm in 1976, but it was pointed out the species name was already used by Escalera in 1914 (Pseudocolaspis occidentalis, now Macrocoma henoni occidentalis), so it was renamed to M. palmaensis the following year.
 Macrocoma splendidula splendidula (Wollaston, 1862): The nominotypical subspecies. It is found on Gran Canaria and Tenerife.

References

splendidula
Endemic beetles of the Canary Islands
Beetles described in 1862
Taxa named by Thomas Vernon Wollaston